Liu Zefeng (born 23 February 1996) is a Chinese footballer currently playing as a midfielder for Jiangxi Beidamen.

Career statistics

Club
.

References

1996 births
Living people
Chinese footballers
Association football midfielders
China League Two players
China League One players
Changchun Yatai F.C. players
Heilongjiang Ice City F.C. players
Kunshan F.C. players